Crocetta is a Milan Metro station on Line 3. The station was opened on 16 December 1990 as part of the extension of the line from Duomo to Porta Romana.

The station is located in Largo della Crocetta, in the city centre just outside the core area, near the Teatro Carcano and the Ca' Granda. The station is at the confluence of Corso di Porta Romana, Corso di Porta Vigentina and Via Alfonso Lamarmora.

Like its northern nearest stations, it is underground in two overlapped tunnels. In initial projects the station was to be called Lamarmora, taking the name from the street which originates from the point where the station is located.

References

Line 3 (Milan Metro) stations
Railway stations opened in 1990